The 1971 season was the 66th season of competitive football in Norway.

Men's football

League season

Promotion and relegation

1. divisjon

2. divisjon

Group A

Group B

District IX–X

District XI

3. divisjon

Norwegian Cup

Final

UEFA competitions

European Cup

First round

|}

European Cup Winners' Cup

First round

|}

UEFA Cup

First round

|}

Second round

|}

National team

References

Rsssf.no "Norwegian Cup 1971"

 
Seasons in Norwegian football